Desmoceratidae is a family belonging to the ammonite superfamily Desmoceratoidea.  They are an extinct group of ammonoids, shelled cephalopods related to squid, belemnites, octopuses, and cuttlefish, and more distantly to the nautiloids, that lived between the  Lower Cretaceous (Upper Valanginian) and Upper
Cretaceous (Upper Maastrichtian).

References

External links 
  Desmoceratidae on Ammonites et autres fossiles - Cyril Baudouin
  Desmoceratidae on Laboratoire du Groupe de Recherche en Paléobiologie et Biostratigaphie des Ammonites; Ammonites du Jurassique et du Crétacé

 
Ammonitida families
Desmoceratoidea
Valanginian first appearances
Maastrichtian extinctions